Josef Frank (July 15, 1885 – January 8, 1967) was an Austrian-born architect, artist, and designer who adopted Swedish citizenship in the latter half of his life. Together with Oskar Strnad, he created the Vienna School of Architecture, and its concept of Modern houses, housing and interiors.

Life 
Josef Frank was of Jewish ancestry.  His parents, merchant Ignaz (Isak) Frank (October 17, 1851 – January 27, 1921 Vienna) and the Vienna-born Jenny (September 3, 1861–10 February 1941 Vienna), were originally from Heves in Hungary.  He designed his parents' grave in the old Jewish section of Vienna's Central Cemetery (Group 19, Row 58, Grave No.52). He studied architecture at the Vienna University of Technology.  He then taught at the Vienna School of Arts and Crafts from 1919 to 1925. He was a founding member of the Vienna Werkbund, initiator and leader of the 1932 project Werkbundsiedlung in Vienna. In 1933, he emigrated to Sweden, where he gained citizenship in 1939. He was the most prestigious designer in the Stockholm design company Svenskt Tenn (Swedish Pewter), recruited by the founder of the company, Estrid Ericson.  He remained in Sweden after 1945 despite attempts to return him to Vienna. The Vienna Circle manifesto lists three of his publications in a bibliography of closely related authors. Politically Frank believed in socialism.

He was also the brother of the physicist, mathematician, and philosopher Philipp Frank.

Legacy 
Josef Frank dealt early on with public housing and housing estates. Contrary to most other architects of the interwar period in Vienna, he took the idea of settlement and not the creation of so-called super blocks in the municipal housing. He also rejected facade decor and clearly preferred functional forms. The Viennese architect and furniture designer Luigi Blue refers to him as one of his idols.
In addition to his architectural work he created numerous designs for furniture, furnishings, fabrics, wallpaper and carpet. He has been a painter, as well.

An exhibition of his textile designs is to be held from January to May 2017, at the Fashion and Textile Museum in London.

Recognition 
 1965 First Austrian Frank exhibition by the Austrian Society for Architecture
 1965 Grand Austrian State Prize for Architecture
 1981 Frank exhibition in the Austrian Museum of Applied Arts, Vienna 
 1991 The Josef-Frank-Gasse street in Donaustadt Vienna was named after the architect
 2007 The exhibition Josef Frank. Architect and Outsider , The Jewish Museum Vienna field office Judenplatz
 2010 Was honored with a Google Doodle on July 15 in honor of his 125th birthday.
 2015-16 Exhibition "Josef Frank: Against Design" in the Austrian Museum of Applied Arts, Vienna

Major projects 

 Exhibition design of the East Asian Museum in Cologne (1912)
 House Wilbrandtgasse 12, Vienna (1914) with Oskar Wlach and Oskar Strnad
 Municipal housing Hoffingergasse in Altmannsdorf (Vienna), (1921–24), together with Erich Faber
 Residential Building Wiedenhoferhof, Vienna (1924–25)
 Residential Building Winarskyhof (1924–26), together with Adolf Loos, Peter Behrens, Margarete Schütte-Lihotzky
 Duplex in the Weißenhofsiedlung, Stuttgart (1927)
 Residential Building Sebastian-Kelch-Gasse 1–3, Vienna (1928–29)
 House Beer (1929–30 with Wlach) The 800 square meter Villa Beer in Vienna 13th, Wenzgasse 12, realized in 1929 / 1930 for the rubber shoe sole manufacturer Julius Beer together with Oskar Wlach
 Residential Building Simmeringer Hauptstraße 142–150, Vienna, (1931–32) with Oskar Wlach
 Residential Building Leopoldine-Glöckel-yard in Vienna (1931–32)
 Management of the Werkbundsiedlung in Vienna and Project for a house at Woinovichgasse 32 (1932)
 Five villas in Falsterbo, southern Sweden (1927–1936)
 House Vienna 19th, Wilbrandtgasse 3 (1914; former house of Emil and Agnes Scholl), with Oskar Wlach and Oskar Strnad
 House Vienna 19th, Wilbrandtgasse 11 (1914; former house of Oskar and Hanny Strauss), with Oskar Wlach and Oskar Strnad
 Villa Hugo Blitz, Weilburgstrasse 22 in Baden near Vienna, together with Oskar Wlach, "terrace and storey building", visible from the lido to this day (1928, preliminary studies from 1926)

Publications 
Architecture as Symbol: Elements of the German '''New Building', 1931 (in German)The International Werkbundsiedlung Vienna 1932, 1932 (in German)
 Josef Frank. Schriften/Writings (Deutsch/English); 2 Bände/2 Volumes; (Ed.): Tano Bojankin, Christopher Long and Iris Meder, Metroverlag, Wien 2012 

 References 

 Further reading 
 Botstein, Leon; Stritzl-Levine, Nina: Josef Frank, Architect and Designer: An Alternative Vision of the Modern Home, Yale University Press, 2000
 Long, Christopher: Josef Frank: Life and Work'', University Of Chicago Press, 2001

External links 

 Directory of Josef Frank's designs
Sweden's bright spark: celebrating 30s designer Josef Frank on The Guardian

1885 births
1967 deaths
20th-century Swedish architects
Modernist architects from Austria
International style architects
Vienna Circle
Wiener Werkstätte
Austrian architects
Jewish architects
Austrian designers
Swedish designers
Austrian people of Hungarian-Jewish descent
Swedish Jews
Jewish emigrants from Nazi Germany to Sweden
People from Baden bei Wien
Austrian socialists